Ecology Glacier is a glacier flowing northeast into Admiralty Bay, King George Island, north of Llano Point. It was named by the Polish Antarctic Expedition, 1980, after the Institute of Ecology of the Polish Academy of Sciences, the sponsor of nearby Arctowski Station.

See also
 List of glaciers in the Antarctic
 Glaciology

References 

 

Glaciers of King George Island (South Shetland Islands)